Macho Sluts is a 1988 book of erotic short stories by Pat Califia, published by Alyson Publications. Then lesbian identified, Califia had written the stories between 1977 and 1988 during a period of fierce struggle between lesbian feminist SM practitioners and anti-pornography feminists in the San Francisco Bay area. Media scholar Carolyn Bronstein has characterized these articles, and the anthology, as lesbian romance fiction. As such, they made lesbians visible within the leather and SM communities, and lesbians practicing what came to be known as "power exchange" visible in the feminist community. Bronstein characterizes the collection as an activist response to anti-pornography feminists' characterization of "SM as a dangerous form of sexuality that reproduced the positions of power associated with heterosexuality."

Exploring S/M fantasy concepts, it includes the stories "The Calyx of Isis" and "Jessie" along with six other shorter works, "The Finishing School", "The Hustler", "The Surprise Party", "The Vampire", "The Spoiler", and "A Dash of Vanilla".  It includes lesbians, gay men, and those of indeterminate sexuality, with their broad ranges of fantasies.

On its original publication the book was sold in a plastic shrink wrap with a free badge stating "Macho Slut".

References

1988 short story collections
BDSM literature
Erotic short stories
1990s LGBT literature
LGBT literature in the United States
Alyson Books books